Wudong Bridge, may refer to:

 , a historic stone arch bridge in Cangnan County, Zhejiang, China.

 , a historic stone arch bridge in Wujin District of Changzhou, Zhejiang, China.

 Wudong Bridge (Taizhou), a historic stone arch bridge in Huangyan District of Taizhou, Zhejiang, China.